The Qingdao International Horticultural Exposition 2014 is a horticultural exhibition recognised by the International Association of Horticultural Producers (as AIPH class A2/B1) in Qingdao, China. It is being held from April 25 to October 25 in Baiguo Mountain Park of Licang District. The motto of the exhibition is: "From the earth, for the Earth".

Mascot
The mascot is named “Qingqing”. The mascots blue-green colour (qing) represents the old Chinese saying that blue-green comes from blue but is superior as green has been added.

Pavilions
Theme Pavilion

Botanical Pavilion

Science Pavilion

References

External links
Qingdao International Horticultural Exposition 2014 (Chinese)
Qingdao International Horticultural Exposition 2014 (English)
Emblem and Mascot of Expo 2014
International Horticultural Expositions Overview

2014 in China
Qingdao
2014
International horticultural exhibitions
Garden festivals in China